Allan Vincent Clark (born June 8, 1957) is a former American football running back in the National Football League who played for the New England Patriots, the Green Bay Packers, and the Buffalo Bills.  Clark played collegiate ball for Northern Arizona University before being drafted by the New England Patriots in the 10th round of the 1979 NFL Draft.  Clark played professionally for 3 seasons and retired in 1982.

References

External links
 Allan Clark's alumni bio from the New England Patriots

1957 births
Living people
People from Grand Rapids, Minnesota
American football running backs
Northern Arizona Lumberjacks football players
New England Patriots players
Buffalo Bills players
Green Bay Packers players
Arizona Outlaws players